Anne Veaute (1725–1794) was a French businessperson.  She founded a textile factory in Castres in 1756. She became a major figure in the French textile industry, introduced several innovations and dominated the textile industry of her region.

References 

1725 births
1794 deaths
18th-century French businesspeople
French industrialists
18th-century French businesswomen